This is a list of Labour Party  Members of Parliament (MPs) elected to the British House of Commons for the 54th Parliament of the United Kingdom. This includes MPs elected at the 2005 general election and those subsequently elected in by-elections.

The names in italics are those who did not serve throughout this Parliament and the names with a * next to them are MPs who first entered Parliament in a by-election.

This list does not include Labour Co-operative MPs.

 For Labour Co-operative MPs, see List of United Kingdom Labour Co-operative MPs 2005-
 For a combined list, see List of United Kingdom Labour and Labour Co-operative MPs 2005-.

 MPs 

By-elections

See also
 Results of the 2005 United Kingdom general election
 List of MPs elected in the 2005 United Kingdom general election
 Members of the House of Lords
 List of MPs for Northern Ireland
 List of MPs for Scotland
 List of MPs for Wales
 :Category:UK MPs 2005-2010

Current Labour
Labour